For You (stylised as "for you") was an Italian shopping and movie television channel, available on digital terrestrial television in Italy. Launched on March 1, 2011 as ME, "for you" was the replacement for Mediashopping. The channel adopted its current name on June 6, 2011. The channel has closed broadcasts on May 20, 2013 and has been replaced by the new Mediaset TV channel Top Crime.

It was owned by Mediashopping SpA, a subsidiary of the Mediaset group and broadcast in Italy on DTT channel 39 on mux L'Espresso 1 .

Shopping TV channel

Programming

Until June 6, 2011 ME transmitted home shopping for 16 hours a day, from 8a.m. to midnight, using two different brands: the historic Mediashopping and the previous by ME preceded by the name of one of the six divisions: Beauty, Cook, Electro, Home, Sport and Toys.

Until December 31, 2011 for you transmitted home shopping and also programs for 17 hours a day, from 8a.m. to 1a.m., as Show 5 Stelle and using just the new brand for you preceded by the name of one of the nine divisions.

The broadcast of TV movies and old TV shows by Mediaset resumed on December 16, 2012 after almost a year of uninterrupted teleshopping programs. From that date on, movies and other non-shopping events were transmitted during 4 breaks in the daytime schedule.

Shopping programs
Baby for you
Beauty for you
Big Guy for you
Book for you
Cook for you
Electro for you
Home for you
Movie for you
Sport for you
Tech for you
Toys for you
Show 5 Stelle: the best products of the day from all divisions.

Hosts

All articles are accurately described with demonstrations on using, by experts of the line presented and these hosts:

Raffaello Benedetti
Veronica Canizzaro
Jill Cooper
Francesca De Rose
Loredana Di Cicco
Nino Graziano Luca
Marco Marino
Ninfa Raffaglio
Andrea Spina
Emanuele Turchi
Bill Wilsoncia

Programs cooking recipes

 Cotto e mangiato: either all days from 12 to 12:15a.m., with reply from 6.45 to 7p.m.
 In cucina con Mengacci: either all days from 11.30 to 12a.m.

In Cotto e mangiato Benedetta Parodi and in In cucina con Mengacci Davide Mengacci with Loredana Di Cicco cook using products of line Cook for you.

Headings

 "Coming Soon": cinema
 "Meteo": weather
 "Oroscopo": horoscope
 "TGCOM": news
 "Tra parentesi": beauty and lifestyle.

TV movie

Programming

From 1a.m. to 8a.m. for you transmits replicas of movies and varied TV series already transmitted by the channel Mediaset.

Movies

The channel transmits especially movies of:

 adventure,
 comedy
 Italian comedy,
 historical,
 musical

TV Series

The most famous of TV series transmitted are:
 Grandi domani produced by Maurizio Costanzo and Maria De Filippi, with the presence of emerging actors as Hoara Borselli, Giovanni Esposito, Irene Ferri, Marco Giallini, Francesco Paolantoni, Primo Reggiani, Massimiliano Varrese and the ballerina Oriella Dorella
 Giornalisti with Riccardo Garrone
 I cinque del quinto piano with Gian Fabio Bosco and Luca Sandri.

See also
Digital television in Italy
Home shopping
Mediaset
Television film

References

External links
 Official website 
 Company Website 

Mediaset television channels
Defunct television channels in Italy
Television channels and stations established in 2011
Television channels and stations disestablished in 2013
2011 establishments in Italy
2013 disestablishments in Italy
Shopping networks